The 1910–11 VMI Keydets basketball team represented the Virginia Military Institute in their third ever season of basketball. The Keydets went 3–5, coached by J. Mitchell. They played their games out of the Lexington Skating Rink.

Schedule

See also 
VMI Keydets
VMI Keydets men's basketball

References

External links
 Official men's basketball Site

VMI Keydets basketball seasons
Vmi